Collinder 228 is an open cluster within the southern part of the Carina Nebula NGC 3372, about 25' south of η Carinae. It is probably composed of stars which recently formed from the material in the nebula. QZ Carinae is the brightest member of Collinder 228 with an apparent magnitude between 6.16 and 6.49.

References 

Carina Nebula
Open clusters
Carina (constellation)
Star-forming regions